Mavin may refer to:

 Fred Mavin (1884–1957), English football player and manager
 Steve Mavin (born 1968), Australian rugby league footballer
 Mavin Manyshaped, heroine of three science fiction novels by Sheri S. Tepper
 Mavin, Qazvin, Iran, a village
 Mavin Records, a Nigerian-based record label established in 2012
 Mavin Foundation, an American community organization for mixed-heritage people

See also
 Maven (disambiguation)